August F. Foerste (1862–1936) was an American geologist, science teacher, and paleontologist.

Biography
Foerste was born on May 7, 1862, in Dayton, Ohio. He studied geology at Denison University, from which he received a bachelor's degree in 1887. Later, he got master's degree at Harvard University in 1888, and PhD in 1890. He served as an assistant for the United States Geological Survey, in Harvard, in which he studied stratigraphy and petrography of New England. After his graduation from Harvard, he studied at the Heidelberg University and College de France for two years. He returned to Dayton in 1893 and became a science teacher at Robert W Steele High School, a position which he kept till his retirement in 1932.

In 1896, 1897, and 1899 he spent his summer vacations in Indiana, while conducting geological surveys. In 1908 and 1919 he spent his summers in Ohio, doing his geological surveys there as well. From 1904 to 1912 he was in Kentucky conducting a geological survey; doing the same while in Canada from 1911 to 1912. He began researching invertebrate paleontology at the United States National Museum in 1920, where he was appointed an Associate in Paleontology in 1932. He died on April 23, 1936, and is buried at Woodland Cemetery.

References

American geologists
American paleontologists
1862 births
1936 deaths
Denison University alumni
Harvard University alumni
Heidelberg University (Ohio) alumni
Collège de France alumni
People from Dayton, Ohio
Burials at Woodland Cemetery and Arboretum